Karen Kondazian (born January 27, 1950) is an American actress and author. She is a recipient of the Los Angeles Drama Critics Circle Award's Best Actress award and is a four-time Drama-Logue Awards winner. She had a regular starring role in Shannon, as well guest-starring roles on Wiseguy, Frasier, NYPD Blue, and others.

Life and career

Karen Kondazian was born in Newton, Massachusetts to an Armenian family. She attended Abraham Lincoln High School, and received a B.A. from San Francisco State College, and graduated from the London Academy of Music and Dramatic Art. Kondazian began working in theater, starring in productions such as The Rose Tattoo and Master Class.

As a child, she appeared on Art Linkletter's Kids Say the Darndest Things.

She won the (1978) Los Angeles Drama Critics Circle Award's Best Actress award for her role in the Tennessee Williams play The Rose Tattoo (1978) and four Drama-Logue Awards for Sweet Bird of Youth (1980), Lady House Blues (1981), Vieux Carré (1983) and Tamara (1985). Kondazian met Williams at a Los Angeles Drama Critics Circle luncheon honoring him, and Williams reportedly allowed Kondazian to produce any of his plays. She was also nominated for an Ovation Best Actress Award in Master Class.

Her work on the stage led to numerous TV and film roles, including a recurring starring role the CBS series Shannon as Irene Lokatelli, and guest-starring roles in Wiseguy, Frasier, NYPD Blue and the TV biopic James Dean. She also was in Yes, Giorgio and Cobra.

In 2000 Kondazian wrote the reference work The Actors Encyclopedia of Casting Directors and The Whip in 2012, published by the Hansen Publishing Group, a historical novel about stagecoach driver Charley Parkhurst. The Whip was well-reviewed for its historical accuracy and story.

Kondazian is a member of the Actors Studio and the Academy of Television Arts and Sciences.

Personal life
Kondazian was in a relationship with actor Lex Barker from 1972 until his death on May 11, 1973. They were engaged.

Filmography

Film

Television

Video games

Theatre

Bibliography
 The Actors Encyclopedia of Casting Directors (2000)
 The Whip (2012)

Awards

Acting
 Los Angeles Drama Critics Circle Award for Best Actress, The Rose Tattoo (1979)
 Drama-Logue Award for Sweet Bird of Youth (1980)
 Drama-Logue Award for Lady House Blues (1981)
 LA Weekly Theater Award for Best Actress, Vieux Carré (1983)
 Drama-Logue Award for Vieux Carré (1983)
 Drama-Logue Award for Tamara (1985)
 Back Stage Garland Award for The Night of the Iguana (2000)
 Ovation Award for Master Class, Best Production of the Year (2004)
 Back Stage Garland Award for Master Class (2004)
 Maddy Award for Master Class (2004)
 Entertainment Today Award for Best Actress, Master Class (2004)

Writing
 2014 Readers Favorite, Gold Medal Prize for Winner Best Western Fiction, The Whip
 2013 Global Ebook Awards, First Place - Winner Best Historical Fiction, The Whip
 USA Book News Award, Best Historical Fiction, The Whip (2012)
 National Indie Excellence Award, Best Western, The Whip (2013)
 International Book Award, Best Western, The Whip (2013)

References

External links
 
 
 
 KCAL9 Interviews Karen Kondazian
 Karen Kondazian featured in ABC/NBC Monterey

1950 births
Living people
21st-century American novelists
American women novelists
American film actresses
American television actresses
Actresses from Los Angeles
Actresses from Massachusetts
Actors from Newton, Massachusetts
Writers from Los Angeles
Writers from Newton, Massachusetts
American writers of Armenian descent
San Francisco State University alumni
University of Vienna alumni
Alumni of the London Academy of Music and Dramatic Art
American historical novelists
21st-century American women writers
Women historical novelists
Novelists from Massachusetts
20th-century American actresses
21st-century American actresses
American women non-fiction writers
20th-century American non-fiction writers
20th-century American women writers